Salt Spring Air (also known as Saltspring Air) part of Harbour Air Seaplanes, was a floatplane company based on Salt Spring Island, British Columbia, Canada. It operates scheduled flights, charter air service and tours based in Ganges in Harbour Air Seaplanes livery with the Salt Spring Air name on the side of the aircraft and specializes in routes between the Gulf Islands and Vancouver Island. Along with West Coast Air, Harbour Air and Seair Seaplanes, Salt Spring Air is one of the four airlines that operate in the Vancouver Harbour Water Airport and Vancouver Harbour Flight Centre. Scheduled flights by the company also operate between the Gulf Islands and the Vancouver International Airport.

History

In June 2003, St. Clair McColl started Salt Spring Air, with local seaplane services based on the Gulf Islands with a four-seat Cessna 185. The airline's services were targeted to the islands' residents, and personalized services were offered. Since then, with the introduction of de Havilland Beavers in 2004, the company's fleet has grown to four planes operating six scheduled flights from Salt Spring Island to Vancouver, and other scheduled flights fly to various other locations on the Gulf Islands. It remains the only airline based on Salt Spring Island.
 
During what began as a routine flight on March 19, 2007, McColl rescued a father and son from the frigid waters of the Strait of Georgia after a passenger noticed their capsized boat and notified McColl. The pilot and his two passengers were later honoured by the Lifesaving Society of British Columbia for the rescue.

In November 2015, Salt Spring Air was purchased by the Harbour Air Seaplanes Group which operates in Harbour Air Seaplanes livery with Salt Spring Air name. Salt Spring Air's fleet now joins Harbour Air Seaplanes, Westcoast Air, and Whistler Air as the largest all seaplane airline in the world.

See also
 List of seaplane operators

References

Further reading
Sep 21, 2006 11:00 ET VancouverTV.tv Launches Daily "What's Going On" as the Next Phase of Its Online Television "For example, Salt Spring Air flew us to Ganges, worked with the community and helped produce a fantastic experience of a great destination."
Salt Spring Air’s dock shelter is a wheelhouse The little shelter on the dock is a replica of the wheelhouse of the MV “Cy Peck” - built in 1922 and served as a ferry to the Gulf Islands from 1930 to 1966.
Santa's airline Salt Spring Air take Santa around the Gulf Islands.
The most famous bush plane some say in the world, Salt Spring Air operate three from the Ganges base.

External links

Official site: Salt Spring Air

2010 disestablishments in British Columbia
Salt Spring Island
Seaplane operators
Airlines established in 2003
2003 establishments in British Columbia
Regional airlines of British Columbia
Defunct companies of British Columbia
Defunct airlines of Canada
Defunct seaplane operators